Events in the year 2018 in Angola.

Incumbents
 President: João Lourenço 
 Vice President: Bornito de Sousa

Events

Sexual Orientation and Gender Identity 

Iris Angola, the country's only gay rights lobby group established in 2013, was given legal status in June. Due to the lack of recognition by the state governments, members of this group had faced discrimination accessing health and education services. This "historic moment" allowed homosexuality rights to be defended in Angola.

Treatment of Migrants 

Over 400,000 Congolese migrants were expelled from Angola in October. President Lourenço claimed this was to reduce diamond smuggling, but was backed up with nonexistent evidence. Nonetheless, migrants were killed, looted, and forced out of the country, expressing fear and intimidation after the expulsion.

Deaths

1 April – Almerindo Jaka Jamba, politician (UNITA) (b. 1949).
16 October – Jonas (1972–2018) - Carlos Emanuel Romeu Lima, footballer
20 October – Pedro Luís Guido Scarpa, Roman Catholic prelate, Bishop of Ndalatando ( b. 1925).

References

 
2010s in Angola
Years of the 21st century in Angola
Angola
Angola